Lisa Marian Paul  is a former senior Australian public servant and policymaker. She was the Secretary of the Department of Education and Training until February 2016.

Personal life
Lisa Paul was born in California, United States, the daughter of two teachers. When she was young, Paul and her family moved to Christchurch, New Zealand and then to Adelaide, South Australia following her father's job opportunities. Paul holds an Arts degree she obtained from the Australian National University.

Career
After a first-job working at Target Newton in Adelaide, Paul's first public service role was in the Australian Capital Territory (ACT) Government Housing Trust. Her career in the ACT public sector included the time during the ACT's transition to self-government.

Paul led the Commonwealth's domestic response to the 2002 Bali bombings while a Deputy Secretary in the Department of Family and Community Services.

Paul was appointed Secretary of the Department of Education, Science and Training in October 2004. The Department was split into two in 2013 after the Abbott Government took power and Paul was appointed Secretary of the Department of Education. She was also named to head the new Department of Education and Training when the Department was formed in December 2014, encompassing much of the previous department.

In December 2015, Paul announced her intention to leave her role at the Department of Education and Training in February 2016. In December 2016 Paul was appointed a member of the Australian Government's Naval Shipbuilding Advisory Board.

Paul has served as the Chair of headspace since 2018 and is a Member of Raise Foundation's Patron's Advisory Council, Chaired by David Gonski AC.

Awards and honours
In October 2003 Paul was awarded a Public Service Medal for outstanding public service as Chair of the Commonwealth Bali Interagency Taskforce in the development of the Commonwealth's response in support of the victims of the bombings which occurred in Bali on 12 October 2002. In June 2011 Paul was appointed an Officer of the Order of Australia for distinguished service to public sector leadership in key policy and program implementation, particularly through driving reform in education, employment and workplace. In the same year Paul was named as Federal Government Leader of the Year.

Notes

References and further reading

Living people
Year of birth missing (living people)
Officers of the Order of Australia
Australian National University alumni
Recipients of the Public Service Medal (Australia)
Secretaries of the Australian Government Education Department